Hallbera Guðný Gísladóttir (born 14 September 1986) is an Icelandic footballer who plays for Swedish Damallsvenskan club IFK Kalmar and the Iceland national team. Although primarily a left-back, she can also play further forward as a left winger.

Club career
She played for Valur from 2006 to 2011 before moving to Sweden. In December 2011 Hallbera went on trial with KIF Örebro DFF who made a contract offer, but she opted to join Piteå instead.

In 2014, she joined Torres of the Italian women's Serie A.

International career
Hallbera made her senior international debut at the 2008 edition of the Algarve Cup, in a 2–0 win over Poland.

She was called up to be part of the national team for the UEFA Women's Euro 2013.

Personal life
Hallbera's father Gísli Gíslason is a former mayor of Akranes.

Honours

Club
Valur
Winner
 Úrvalsdeild: 2006, 2007, 2008, 2009, 2010, 2019
 Icelandic Women's Cup: 2006, 2009, 2010, 2011

References

External links
 Profile  at svenskalag.se 
 
 
 
 Profile at fussballtransfers.com 
 Profile at soccerdonna.de 
 
 
 

1986 births
Living people
Hallbera Gudny Gisladottir
Hallbera Gudny Gisladottir
Torres Calcio Femminile players
Serie A (women's football) players
Damallsvenskan players
Hallbera Gudny Gisladottir
Expatriate women's footballers in Sweden
Piteå IF (women) players
Djurgårdens IF Fotboll (women) players
Hallbera Gudny Gisladottir
Women's association football wingers
Women's association football fullbacks
Hallbera Gudny Gisladottir
Hallbera Gudny Gisladottir
FIFA Century Club
UEFA Women's Euro 2022 players
UEFA Women's Euro 2017 players